Anna Lotta Jõgeva (born 4 July 1999) is an Estonian alpine skier. She represented Estonia at the 2018 Winter Olympics.

References

External links
 
 
 

1999 births
Living people
Estonian female alpine skiers
Olympic alpine skiers of Estonia
Alpine skiers at the 2018 Winter Olympics
Alpine skiers at the 2016 Winter Youth Olympics